1604 Tombaugh, provisional designation , is a rare-type Eos asteroid from the outer region of the asteroid belt, approximately 32 kilometers in diameter. It was discovered on 24 March 1931, by American astronomer Carl Otto Lampland at Lowell Observatory in Flagstaff, Arizona, in the United States. It was named after the discoverer of Pluto, Clyde Tombaugh.

Classification and orbit 

Tombaugh is a member of the Eos family that orbits the Sun in the outer main-belt at a distance of 2.7–3.3 AU once every 5 years and 3 months (1,920 days). Its orbit has an eccentricity of 0.10 and an inclination of 9° with respect to the ecliptic. Its observation arc begins at Flagstaff, one year prior to its official discovery observation at Lowell Observatory.

Physical characteristics 

Tombaugh is classified as an X-type asteroid. It is also classified as a rare XSCU type in the Tholen, and as a transitional Xc type in the SMASS taxonomy.

Rotation period 

In April 2010 and November 2012, rotational lightcurves of Tombaugh were obtained from photometric observations at Oakley Southern Sky Observatory, Australia, and at Bassano Bresciano Observatory, Italy. Lightcurve analysis gave a rotation period of 7.047 and 7.056 hours with a brightness variation of 0.16 and 0.35 magnitude, respectively.

These periods supersede previous results obtained by astronomers Claes-Ingvar Lagerkvist (1975), Richard P. Binzel (1984) and Krisztián Sárneczky.

Diameter and albedo 

According to the surveys carried out by the Infrared Astronomical Satellite IRAS and the Japanese Akari satellite, Tombaugh measures 28.78 and 32.33 kilometers in diameter, and its surface has an albedo of 0.138 and 0.104, respectively. The Collaborative Asteroid Lightcurve Link derives an albedo of 0.0933 and a diameter of 32.25 kilometers with an absolute magnitude of 10.65.

Naming 

This minor planet was named for American astronomer Clyde Tombaugh (1906–1997), famous for his discovery of Pluto in 1930. The discovering Lowell Observatory named this asteroid on the occasion of a symposium on Pluto, held in 1980. When Tombaugh examined the photographic plates during the trans-Saturnian search program at the Lowell Observatory, he also marked over 4,000 minor planets on these plates. The approved naming citation was published by the Minor Planet Center on 1 April 1980.

References

External links 
 Asteroid Lightcurve Database (LCDB), query form (info )
 Dictionary of Minor Planet Names, Google books
 Asteroids and comets rotation curves, CdR – Observatoire de Genève, Raoul Behrend
 Discovery Circumstances: Numbered Minor Planets (1)-(5000) – Minor Planet Center
 
 

001604
Discoveries by Carl Otto Lampland
001604
Named minor planets
001604
001604
19310324